Okulov is a Russian masculine surname, its feminine counterpart is Okulova. The surname originates either from the old-Russian nickname Okul (meaning crook, deceiver) or from the Greek given name Aquila (Ἀκύλας). It may refer to
Aleksandr Okulov (1908-1993), Russian philosopher
Artem Okulov (born 1994), Russian weightlifter
Konstantin Okulov (born 1995), Russian ice hockey player
Valery Okulov (born 1952), Deputy Minister of Transport of the Russian Federation

See also
Akulov

References

Russian-language surnames